The Brazilian National Council for Scientific and Technological Development (CNPq, earlier ) is an organization of the Brazilian federal government under the Ministry of Science and Technology, dedicated to the promotion of scientific and technological research and to the formation of human resources for research in the country.

Background 
The main attributes that the National Council for Scientific and Technological Development (CNPq) see towards is the national development of Brazilian researchers and institutes, while developing recognition it wants on a global scale. The CNPq was started in 1951, and has a leading role in conducting and formulating research about technology, science and also innovation. The goal of the CNPq is to promote science, technology and innovation and act in the formulation of their policies which thereby will lead to taking the frontier in knowledge, national sovereignty and sustainable development. By doing this, they are on the road to being recognized for their excellence and development not only in these elements but for the country as a whole.

See also
CAPES (Brazil)
Lattes Platform
Brazilian science and technology
Universities and higher education in Brazil
Ministry of Science and Technology (Brazil)
Maria Laura Moura Mouzinho Leite Lopes
Cesar Lattes

References

External links
 CNPq website

Scientific organisations based in Brazil
Federal Government of Brazil
Organisations based in Brasília
Research and development organizations